The Church of St John the Baptist is the parish church in the village of Royston in South Yorkshire, England. It is a Church of England church in the Diocese of Leeds.

Built by the monks of the nearby Priory of St. Mary Magdalen at Lund (Monk Bretton Priory), the present building can be dated back to before 1234. The association of this Church with the monks would have ended abruptly when their Priory was seized by the Crown and dissolved in 1539.

There was possibly an Anglo Saxon Church here, evidenced by some early foundation work, and the discovery of a fragment of an Anglo-Saxon cross, now displayed to the right of the High Altar. On the opposite side of the Sanctuary, the solid Sacristy door with its original iron work is particularly fine.

The Eastern part of the Chancel is probably the earliest part of the present building, the masonry of the North and South walls being part of the Church described in 1240 as "newly built".

The proportions of the Chancel would seem to agree with those of a mid- 13th century structure, though it is uncertain if it was originally flanked by aisles. The Decorated tracery of the East window and the distinctive ogee (onion shaped) arch of the Sacristy doorway in the north wall of the Sanctuary are part of a re-modelling of circa 1340, but earlier is the North Aisle with its windows with Y tracery of the early 14th century.

The Nave with the addition of the Clerestory and magnificent Roof is a re-building in two stages in the 15th century. The three Eastern bays with their arcade of unusual basket arches dates to circa 1413–18. The Western bay (circa 1480) is where the tower originally stood. There is an enclosed stairway within the North West wall, with a lancet window into Church. This was probably the access to an earlier tower. The stonework here matches the arcades in the Chancel and the enlarged Lady Chapel of circa 1430–40. All this is Perpendicular in style, as is the Great West Tower which was built in the 1480s. Whilst the Tower has the usual diagonal buttresses, crenellated parapet and crocketted pinnacles, it is more remarkable for its extremely unusual Oriel Window at the same level as the ringing chamber.

The present clock mechanism was installed in 1898 to commemorate Queen Victoria’s Diamond Jubilee the previous year. The faces were restored in the early 1970’s.

The Church was extensively restored in 1867-69 by J. L. Pearson. A floor plan (1818) showing how it looked prior to that restoration is displayed at the West end of the North Aisle. The Chancel was extensively re-ordered in the 1980’s, at which time the pre-Reformation Altar Stone was discovered buried in the floor of the Sanctuary. It was restored, and the base upon which the Altar Stone is now fixed incorporates stones from Monk Bretton Priory, the Shrine of Our Lady of Rocamadour (France) and the now-demolished National School of 1844. The High Altar also contains a Relic of St. Justin, Martyr, (Martyred in 165).

Upon the Altar is the Tabernacle in which is reserved the Blessed Sacrament. The white light burning above reminds us of the Presence of Our Lord Jesus Christ in His Blessed Sacrament.

The West end was totally re-modelled in 2001-02 and contains a litch and toilet with spacious Gallery above.  The 1959 tower screen by Martin Dutton, the ‘Lizard man’, was re-fashioned as the Utility room door at the west end of the North Aisle. It bears the shields of the Province of York (crossed keys), the Diocese of Wakefield (fleur de lys) and of Monk Bretton Priory (covered cups).   The Tower (regretfully not open to the public) contains a full peal of eight bells, six re-cast after the Second World War (1946) and two added in 1979 by Taylor of Loughborough. The Sanctus Bell is the original number five bell from circa 1530.

The Font which is probably late 15th century, with its beautifully decorated early 20th century cover, was moved to its present position in 2002.

All the Roofs are medieval; those in the Nave and Aisles have finely carved bosses depicting the Head of St. John the Baptist, the Agnus Dei, the Pelican in her piety, Sacred Monograms, The Green Man, some grotesque heads and interesting heraldry. Shown in the North Choir Aisle is an unusual Synod of Bishops. A particular favourite is a man with asses ears. The present brown stain was added in the 19th century and may obscure medieval colour – it certainly makes the roof difficult to read.    Originally the whole interior was plastered and painted; the plaster was stripped from the walls in the 19th century restoration. In the Nave there are fragments of late 16th century and 17th century painted texts. The grey coloured paint over the Chancel Arch obscures a late 17th century painting of Moses and Aaron flanking panels with the Ten Commandments, the Lord's Prayer and the Creed. More visible is the painted lettering on the wide pillar opposite the Font. The text quoted is Amos 8: v. 4–7, and it seems to follow the wording and spelling of the 16th century ‘Breeches’ bible more closely than that of the later King James version.

The Rood Beam which supports images of Our Lord on the Cross with Our Lady and St. John the Evangelist, carved in the 1930s by Read of Exeter was rescued from the redundant Church at Gildersome near Leeds and was restored and fitted here in the 1980s by Peter Larkworthy.

The steps leading to the original Rood Loft survive at the East end of the North Aisle. The Medieval Rood Screen and Loft extended right across the Aisles and Nave. If the steps appear to start fairly high on the wall this is partly because the whole floor level was lowered in the 19th century restoration. The Perpendicular oak Screens, however, are original and probably remnants of the Par-close Screens of the medieval Chapels at the eastern ends of the Chancel Aisles. Also in the 19th century restoration, an extensive Gallery at the Western end of the Nave was removed. The North West door was blocked up at the same time, and a window inserted in its place.    The 20th century statue of St. John the Baptist (our Patron Saint) was made by local Sculptor Steve West in 1993. The Stations of the Cross around the Aisle walls are particularly striking and were painted by Craig Hudson of Sheffield in the 1980s.

Externally, excavations on the North side of Church in 1983, revealed a number of interesting features. A number of pieces of carved stone have obviously been re-used in the 14th and 15th century footings, including a section of an arch (possibly part of an earlier Nave arcade) and, at the West end of the Aisle, half a cross slab grave cover of circa 1300, utilised as the base of a buttress.   Similarly, a re-laying of the South Nave floor in 2009 revealed that at least one of the pillars is supported by a re-used incised stone of substantial proportions.

Stained Glass   The Stained Glass windows are mainly Victorian, but there are various fragments of medieval glass in the top lights of the Lady Chapel and Sacristy windows, some of which date from the 14th and 15th centuries. Additional fragments of medieval glass are currently in storage and it is hoped that these may be re-introduced in the near future. There is, however, one surviving head which escaped the iconoclasts.

The glass in the great East window (1885) is by Clayton and Bell and depicts scenes from the life of Our Lord.

The upper lights of the Lady Chapel East window which depict the Annunciation are by Burlison and Grylls, from circa 1904 (when the Lady Chapel was re-ordered), but the lower part of this window is as recent as 2002 by Simon Harvey of York. The first two windows in the South Aisle are by William Wailes of Newcastle, the third window is by Mayer and Company of Munich.

The West window (1871) is again by Wailes, as is the next window you come across in the North Aisle.  The final window at the head of the North Aisle is again by Clayton and Bell and was recently brilliantly restored by the York Glaziers Trust following severe vandal damage.

References

Grade I listed churches in South Yorkshire
Church of England church buildings in South Yorkshire
12th-century church buildings in England
Anglican Diocese of Leeds